William Summers (1853–1893) was a British politician and barrister.

William Summers may also refer to:

 William H. Summers (1930-2002), British Crown jeweller
 William K. Summers (born 1944), American neuroscientist
 William L. Summers (born 1942), American defense lawyer
 Willie Summers (1893–?), Scottish footballer

See also
 Bill Summers (disambiguation)
 William Sommers (disambiguation)